Youhannes Ezzat Zakaria Badir (12 August 1949 – 27 December 2015) was a Coptic Catholic bishop.

Ordained a priest on 5 August 1973, Zakaria Badir was named bishop of Ismailia, Egypt, on 23 November 1992 and was consecrated bishop on 29 January 1993. He was then named bishop of Luqsor on 23 June 1994.

Notes

External links

1949 births
2015 deaths
Coptic Catholic bishops